Didelotia is a genus of flowering plants in the family Fabaceae.

Species include:
Didelotia africana Baill.
Didelotia afzelii Taub.
Didelotia brevipaniculata J.Léonard
Didelotia engleri Dinkl. & Harms
Didelotia engleriniculata
Didelotia idae J.Léonard, Oldeman & de Wit
Didelotia ledermannii Harms
Didelotia letouzeyi Pellegr.
Didelotia minutiflora (A.Chev.) J.Léonard
Didelotia morelii Aubrév.
Didelotia pauli-sitai Letouzey
Didelotia unifoliolata J.Léonard

References

Detarioideae
Fabaceae genera
Taxa named by Henri Ernest Baillon
Taxonomy articles created by Polbot